John Harriman House is a historic home located at East Bank, Kanawha County, West Virginia.  It was built about 1826, and is a two-story rectangular brick dwelling with a projecting ell.  It features a five-bay front porch with deep cornice supported by eight Doric order columns.

It was listed on the National Register of Historic Places in 1978.

References

Houses completed in 1826
Houses in Kanawha County, West Virginia
Houses on the National Register of Historic Places in West Virginia
National Register of Historic Places in Kanawha County, West Virginia
1826 establishments in Virginia